The Hampshire Formation is a geologic formation in West Virginia, USA. It preserves fossils dating back to the Devonian period.

See also

 List of fossiliferous stratigraphic units in West Virginia

References

 

Devonian West Virginia
Devonian geology of Virginia
Devonian southern paleotemperate deposits